Samir Sabry Abdou (born 13 January 1976) is an Egyptian former footballer who played at both professional and international levels as a midfielder.

Career

Club career
Sabry played club football for ENPPI Club and Asyut Petroleum.

International career
Sabry earned three caps for between 2005 and 2006, and was a member of the squad for the 2006 African Cup of Nations.

He also represented Egypt at the Futsal World Cup in 2000 and 2004, scoring 2 goals in 9 appearances.

External links

1976 births
Living people
Egyptian footballers
Egypt international footballers
Egyptian men's futsal players
Association football midfielders
ENPPI SC players
Egyptian Premier League players
Asyut Petroleum SC players